Htun Eaindra Bo (also Htun Aeindra Bo; born 1 May 1966) is a three-time Myanmar Academy Award winning actress and singer. The Mogok native began her film career in 1991, and has achieved fame and success as an actor and singer. Now in her 50s, she is still a household name in Myanmar, especially for rural Myanmar and continues to make films and performs in concerts.

Background
Htun Eaindra Bo was born on 1 May 1966 in Mogok, Myanmar to Khin Mya Mya and Khin Maung Thein. She is the middle child of three; she has an elder brother and a younger sister, Thet Thet Khine, a House of Representatives MP. Her family was in the jewellery business. Mi Mi Khine was interested entertainment since she was little. She was singing Burmese songs at age four and by age eleven, she began to sing at local concerts.

She graduated with a law (LLB) degree.

Career
Htun entered the entertainment industry with a direct-to-video film, called Kyeza Hnalontha (Professional Heart) in 1991. She released her first album in 1993 with songs by Maung Thit Min and Myo Kyawt Myaing. Her fandom names are Kdra (K for Khine, Dra for Aeindra) and Aeindraies.

She has made over 100 movies in her career.

Personal life
She is married to Aung Minn Tun, and they have a son.

Discography

Solo albums
 Min Atwet Pe (Only For You) (1993)
 Na-Le Thint-Bi (You Should Understand) (1995)
 Einmet Nya Mya (Dreamy Nights) (1997)
 So Yin (If So ...) (1998)
 1999 (1999)
 Sanda Shi Dae Ahound Myar (Desirous Old Songs) (1999)
 Nay-Ya Lay Takhu (A Place) (2000)
 Nha-Youk Ma Shi Bu (There is no other one) (2001)
 Tanta Nay Ze (Still wanting you) (2002)
 Yeeza Oo (First Love) (2004)
 Diary

Duet albums
 Gandaya Cafe (Desert Cafe) with Ringo and Alex
 Hsohn-Naing Gwint (Chance of Being Together) with Alex
 Thone-Youk Zaga (Three People Talk) with Tin Zar Maw and Madi
Kaung Kin Ta Khu Yae Chit Chin (The love of the sky) with Bo Bo and Tun Tun
 Mohn Lo Ma Ya De Chitthu Tway (Couple who can't hate each other) with Dwe
 Myetsi Hmeit-pi Chit Lai Pa (Close you eyes and love it) with Tin Zar Maw
 Ta Gae Ma Chit Bae Nae (Don't really love) with Myo Kyawt Myaing

Collaborative albums
 A-Paing-A-Sa 1.5 (Fragment 1.5)
 A-Phyu-Yaung Thangegyin Tho (To White-Colored Friend)
 Honeymoon Khayi (Honeymoon Trip) -Saw Bwe Hmu Remembrance
 Mei Daw Ma Mei Bu (Haven't Forgotten) -L Khun Yi Live Show
 Min Atwet (For You)
 Alphne Thingyan
 Lu Min Wedding
 Romanson Live Show
 City FM

Awards and nominations
Film awards:

City FM Music Award
She won 6 City FM Music Awards in three categories and four consecutive years.

References

External links

21st-century Burmese women singers
Burmese film actresses
1966 births
Living people
People from Mandalay Region
20th-century Burmese actresses
21st-century Burmese actresses
20th-century Burmese women singers